Samorogouan is a department or commune of Kénédougou Province in south-western Burkina Faso. Its capital is the town of Samorogouan .

Towns and villages

References 

Departments of Burkina Faso
Kénédougou Province